Streptomyces ascomycinicus is a bacterium species from the genus Streptomyces which has been isolated from soil from Kobe City in Japan. Streptomyces ascomycinicus produces ascomycin.

See also 
 List of Streptomyces species

References

Further reading

External links
Type strain of Streptomyces ascomycinicus at BacDive -  the Bacterial Diversity Metadatabase

ascomycinicus
Bacteria described in 2010